Brand New Life is an American comedy-drama television series starring Barbara Eden and Don Murray and produced by Walt Disney Television and NBC Productions that aired on NBC as part of The Magical World of Disney during the 1989–90 television season.

The series originally premiered as a two-hour television movie pilot entitled Brand New Life: The Honeymooners on September 18, 1989, as part of NBC Monday Night at the Movies and its ratings success led to the commissioning of a weekly series. Afterwards, the show's regular timeslot was on Sunday nights on NBC's The Magical World of Disney from October 1, 1989, to April 15, 1990. The series also marked Barbara Eden's first television series since Harper Valley PTA (1981–1982) and is also her third collaboration with Don Murray, having previously starred together in the television films Return of the Rebels (1981) and The Stepford Children (1987).

The theme song "Brand New Life" was written by Steve Tyrell and performed by Jill Colucci.

Synopsis
Barbara McCray (Barbara Eden) is a struggling divorced mother of three teenagers working part-time as a waitress while studying to become a court reporter, who meets and marries Roger Gibbons (Don Murray), a wealthy attorney and widower with three teenagers of his own. Together, they set up housekeeping in his Bel Air home and stories follow the comedic and dramatic incidents of blending two families with contrasting social backgrounds.

Cast
Barbara Eden as Mrs. Barbara McCray Gibbons
Don Murray as Mr. Roger Gibbons
Shawnee Smith as Amanda Gibbons
Byron Thames as Laird Gibbons
Jennie Garth as Ericka McCray
Alison Sweeney as Christy McCray
David Tom as Bart McCray
Eric Foster as Barlow Gibbons

Episode list

TV movie pilot

Series

References

External links
  (pilot)
  (series)
 (pilot)
 
 Brand New Life at epguides.com

1989 American television series debuts
1990 American television series endings
1980s American comedy-drama television series
1990s American comedy-drama television series
NBC original programming
Television films as pilots
Television series by Disney
Television series about families
Television shows filmed in Los Angeles
Television shows set in Los Angeles
English-language television shows